Yearning may refer to:

 Yearning (1964 film), a Japanese film directed by Mikio Naruse
 Yearning (1990 film), an Armenian drama film
 Yearning (1993 film), a Japanese film
 Yearning (album), a 1994 album by Robert Rich and Lisa Moskow
 Yearning (band), an atmospheric doom metal band from Finland
 "Yearning" (song), a 1957 song by George Jones and Jeanette Hicks

See also
 The Yearning (disambiguation)